Rayaparthy is a village and a mandal in Warangal district in the state of Telangana in India.

 List of Villages in  Raiparthy  Mandal
1. Burahanpalle 2. Gannaram 3. Gattikal 4. Jagannadhapalle 5. Katrapalle 6. Keshavapur 7. Kolanpalle 8. Kondapur 9. Konduru 10. Kothur 11. Muripirala 12. Mylaram 13. Ookal 14. Perikaid 15. Pothureddipalle 16. Raiparthy 17. Sannur 18. Thirmalapalle .

References 
 villageinfo.in

Villages in Warangal district
Mandals in Warangal district